New Valley High School is a small SCUSD alternative school outside of the Santa Clara Unified School District office near Lawrence Expressway in Santa Clara. The school was previously located Wilson Alternative Education School, until it was recently relocated in 2001 due to overcrowding. The majority of the students enrolled at New Valley are either behind in earning the 230 required graduation credits, or have been expelled from either Wilcox High School or Santa Clara High School.

History 
New Valley High School was established in 1968 near the Lawrence District office building in small "portable" building due to the small student body.

References

External links 

High schools in Santa Clara County, California
Continuation high schools in California
Public high schools in California
1968 establishments in California